The 2019 LCS season was the second year under partnership and seventh overall of the League of Legends Championship Series (LCS), a professional esports league for the MOBA PC game League of Legends. It was divided into spring and summer splits, each consisting of a regular season and playoff stage. The top six teams from the regular season advanced to the playoff stage, with the top two teams receiving a bye to the semifinals.

The three teams that qualified for the World Championship in 2019 were Team Liquid, Cloud9, and Clutch Gaming.

Spring

Regular season

Player of the Game ranking

Playoffs

Awards

Summer

Regular season 
 Format: Double round robin, best-of-one

Playoffs 
 Format: Single elimination, best-of-five

Season awards

Awards

Ranking

Regional finals

References

External links 
 2019 Official Rules LCS and LACS

League of Legends
League of Legends Championship Series seasons